The women's 4 × 100 metre freestyle relay event at the 2018 Asian Games took place on 19 August at the Gelora Bung Karno Aquatic Stadium.

Schedule
All times are Western Indonesia Time (UTC+07:00)

Records

Results
Legend
DNS — Did not start

Heats

Final

References

Swimming at the 2018 Asian Games